Vienna  is a town in Oneida County, New York, United States. The population was 5,440 at the 2010 census. The town is named after the capital of Austria.

The Town of Vienna is in the western part of the county.

History 
Vienna was formed out of the town of Camden when it was divided in April 1807. The town's original name was "Orange" but shortly after the town's formation, it was renamed to "Bengal." Eight years later, in 1816, Bengal was renamed to its current name of Vienna.

Geography

The town borders Oneida Lake and the western town line is the border of Oswego County. The Erie Canal is on the southern border, near Sylvan Beach. Fish Creek defines part of the eastern town line and joins the Erie Canal near Sylvan Beach.

Demographics

As of the census of 2000, there were 5,819 people, 2,192 households, and 1,565 families residing in the town. The population density was 94.7 people per square mile (36.6/km2). There were 3,037 housing units at an average density of 49.4 per square mile (19.1/km2).  The racial makeup of the town was 97.47% White, 0.50% African American, 0.55% Native American, 0.53% Asian, 0.21% from other races, and 0.74% from two or more races. Hispanic or Latino of any race were 0.77% of the population.

There were 2,192 households, out of which 34.1% had children under the age of 18 living with them, 57.5% were married couples living together, 8.4% had a female householder with no husband present, and 28.6% were non-families. 21.8% of all households were made up of individuals, and 9.1% had someone living alone who was 65 years of age or older. The average household size was 2.65 and the average family size was 3.09.

In the town, the population was spread out, with 27.2% under the age of 18, 7.1% from 18 to 24, 29.3% from 25 to 44, 24.9% from 45 to 64, and 11.5% who were 65 years of age or older. The median age was 37 years. For every 100 females, there were 101.4 males. For every 100 females age 18 and over, there were 102.2 males.

The median income for a household in the town was $36,250, and the median income for a family was $43,871. Males had a median income of $32,337 versus $25,293 for females. The per capita income for the town was $17,195. About 6.0% of families and 8.3% of the population were below the poverty line, including 10.0% of those under age 18 and 3.7% of those age 65 or over.

Communities and locations in Vienna 
Brockway Corners – A location southeast of Elpis.
Dibbletown – A hamlet north of McConnellsville on NY 13, near the northern town line.
Edgewater Beach – A hamlet on the western shore of Oneida Lake, north of Sylvan Beach.
Elpis – A hamlet between Maple Flats and Thompsons Corners.
Fish Creek Landing –  A hamlet at the intersection of Vienna Road and Cook Road.
Hall Corners – A location northwest of Jewell.
Jewell – A hamlet on NY 49 on the northern shore of Oneida Lake.
Long Crossing – A hamlet west of North Bay on Route 49.
Loomis Corners – A location north of Jewell.
Maple Flats – A hamlet near the western town line.
McConnellsville – A hamlet north of Vienna village on Route 13.
North Bay – A hamlet west of Vienna village on Route 49.
Pine – A hamlet in the eastern part of the town.
Sylvan Beach – The Village of Sylvan Beach is on the eastern end of Oneida Lake on Route 13.
Thompson Corners – A hamlet in the northwestern section of the town.
Vienna – The hamlet of Vienna is at the junction of Routes 13 and 49, north of Sylvan Beach village.

Sites of interest in Vienna 
The Grave of Capt. George Marsden – A staff officer to General George Washington.
The Stone Barn

Notable person
Benjamin G. Paddock, Wisconsin businessman and politician, was born in Vienna.

References

External links
  Town of Vienna, NY
 RW&O Railroad, McConnellsville, NY

Utica–Rome metropolitan area
Towns in Oneida County, New York